Leslie Edward Stradling (11 February 19088 January 1998) was an Anglican bishop in three separate African dioceses during the mid-20th century.

Born on 11 February 1908 and educated at King Edward VII School, Sheffield and The Queen's College, Oxford; he was made a deacon on Trinity Sunday 1933 (11 June) and ordained a priest the next Trinity Sunday (27 May 1934) — both times by Richard Parsons, Bishop of Southwark, at Southwark Cathedral. After a curacy at St Paul's, Lorrimore Square he was Vicar of St Luke's, Camberwell and then of St Anne's, Wandsworth before being appointed the Church's youngest bishop in 1945. He was consecrated a bishop on St James's Day 1945 (25 July), by Geoffrey Fisher, Archbishop of Canterbury, at Westminster Abbey. Translated from Masasi to be the first Bishop of South-West Tanganyika in 1952, his final post was as Bishop of Johannesburg.

He died in 1998 in Cape Town.

References

 

 

1908 births
People educated at King Edward VII School, Sheffield
Alumni of The Queen's College, Oxford
Anglican bishops of Masasi
Anglican bishops of South-West Tanganyika
Anglican bishops of Johannesburg
1998 deaths
20th-century Anglican Church of Southern Africa bishops